Kotcherla is a village in Guntur district of the Indian state of Andhra Pradesh. It is located in Ipur mandal of Narasaraopet revenue division.

Geography 

Government and politics 
Kotcherlaa gram panchayat is the local self-government of the village. It is divided into wards and each ward is represented by a ward member.

Kotcherla falls under Vinukonda assembly constituency and Narasaraopet lok sabha constituency.

Education 

As per the school information report for the academic year 2018–19, the village has 7 Zilla/Mandal Parishad schools.

See also 
List of villages in Guntur district

References 

Villages in Guntur district